Roy Judson Snell (November 20, 1878 – September 21, 1959) was an American writer of fiction mainly for young readers.

Biography
Snell was born in Laddonia, Missouri on November 12, 1878 to James and Sarah Knight-Snell.

Snell wrote several juvenile fiction books. While he mostly concentrated on stories for boys there was at least one series of mysteries for girls. He also wrote under the pen names of David O'Hara, James Craig and Joseph Marino.

Snell and his wife Lucile had three sons, Jud, John, and James. The latter, J. Laurie Snell, became a professor of mathematics at Dartmouth College. Jud and John found careers as a businessman and a United States Navy pilot respectively.

In 1938, Snell appeared on Edgar Guest's radio show "It Can Be Done". In 1941 he wrote a series of war stories for boys at the request of his publisher. He retired from writing soon after the end of the World War II. He spent much of his retirement at a summer cottage on Isle Royale, Michigan. Lucille, a concert pianist who had attended the New England Conservatory of Music, suffered from asthma, so the family vacationed in the north, at Hessel, Michigan, and then at Isle Royale.  Here the family acquired a life-lease on a property at Tobin Harbor in Isle Royale National Park. Snell would visit schools in Detroit and Des Moines, lecturing with colored slides showing life on Isle Royale.

Snell died in 1959 at the age of 80. He is buried in Wheaton Cemetery in Wheaton, Illinois.

Works

 Little White Fox And His Arctic Friends (1916)
 An Eskimo Robinson Crusoe (1917)
 Captain Kituk (1918)
 Skimmer And His Thrilling Adventures (1919)
 Skimmer, The Daring, In The Far North (1919)
 Soolook, Wild Boy (c. 1920)
 Triple Spies (1920)
 Lost In The Air (1920)
 Panther Eye (1921)
 The Crimson Flash (1922)
 White Fire (1922)
 The Blue Envelope (1922)
 Curlie Carson Listens In [also written as: James Craig] (1922)
 On The Yukon Trail [written as: James Craig] (1922)
 The Black Schooner (1923)
 The Desert Patrol [written as: James Craig] (1923)
 The Secret Mark (1923)
 The Seagoing Tank (1924)
 The Hidden Trail (1924)
 The Firebug (1925)
 The Flying Sub (1925)
 The Red Lure (1926)
 Dark Treasure (1926)
 Forbidden Cargoes (1927)
 Whispering Isles (1927)
 The Thirteenth Ring (1927)
 Johnny Longbow (1928)
 The Invisible Wall (1928)
 The Rope Of Gold (1929)
 The Gypsy Shawl (1929)
 The Arrow Of Fire (1930)
 The Gray Shadow (1931)
 The Riddle Of The Storm (1932)
 The Galloping Ghost (1933)
 The Phantom Violin (1934)
 Whispers At Dawn (1934)
 Mystery Wings (1935)
 Red Dynamite (1936)
 Seal Of Secrecy (1937)
 The Shadow Passes (1938)
 The Sign Of The Green Arrow (1939)
 Jane Withers And The Phantom Violin (1943)
 Jet Plane Mystery (1944)

 
Sources:

References

External links

 
 
 Obituary for Roy J. Snell from The Detroit News October 6, 1959, via Chance News

1878 births
1959 deaths
People from Audrain County, Missouri
Writers from Wheaton, Illinois
20th-century American novelists
American male novelists
American young adult novelists
Novelists from Missouri
20th-century American male writers